Odessa Historic District is a national historic district located at Odessa, New Castle County, Delaware. It encompasses 82 contributing buildings in the central business district and surrounding residential areas in the shipping and trading center of Odessa. It includes a mix of commercial and residential buildings primarily dating to the 18th and 19th century. The oldest building is the Collins-Sharp House (c. 1700).  Other notable buildings include the Judge Lore House (c. 1830), Brick Hotel (1822), the Davis Store (1824), Cyrus Polk House (1853), Zoar ME Church (1881), Wilson-Warner House, Academy building (1844),
Red Men Lodge (1894), and Old St. Paul's Methodist Episcopal parsonage.  Also located in the district and separately listed are the Appoquinimink Friends Meetinghouse, Corbit-Sharp House, and Old St. Paul's Methodist Episcopal Church.

It was listed on the National Register of Historic Places in 1971, then increased in 1984.

References

External links
 Odessa Historic District, Third Street (Houses), Odessa, New Castle County, DE: 2 photos and 1 photo caption page at Historic American Buildings Survey
 Odessa Historic District, Main Street (Houses), Appoquinimink Creek, High, Main & Fourth Streets, Odessa, New Castle County, DE: 2 photos and 1 photo caption page at Historic American Buildings Survey
 Odessa Historic District, High Street (Houses), Odessa, New Castle County, DE: 2 photos and 1 photo caption page at Historic American Buildings Survey
 The Brick Hotel, Main Street, Odessa, New Castle County, DE: 2 photos and 2 data pages at Historic American Buildings Survey

Buildings and structures in New Castle County, Delaware
Historic districts on the National Register of Historic Places in Delaware
National Register of Historic Places in New Castle County, Delaware